Bishajachara Alahakoonlage Sujatha Alahakoon (born 9 March 1959) is a Sri Lankan politician. She is a former representative of Matale for the United People's Freedom Alliance in the Parliament of Sri Lanka.

References

1959 births
Living people
Sinhalese educators
Sri Lankan Buddhists
Members of the 13th Parliament of Sri Lanka
Janatha Vimukthi Peramuna politicians
United People's Freedom Alliance politicians
Women legislators in Sri Lanka
21st-century Sri Lankan women politicians